Khandwa Junction is on the Jabalpur–Bhusaval section of Howrah–Allahabad–Mumbai line. It lies in Khandwa district in the Indian state of Madhya Pradesh.

History
The Great Indian Peninsula Railway opened Bhusawal–Khandwa section in 1866.

Electrification
The Harda–Khandwa–Bhusaval sector was electrified in 1997–98.

References

External links
 

Railway junction stations in Madhya Pradesh
Railway stations in Khandwa district
Railway stations opened in 1866
1866 establishments in India
Bhusawal railway division